Sher Mamazulunov (born May 17, 1995) is an Uzbek kickboxer, currently competing in the middleweight division of Fair Fight.

He is ranked as the fourth best middleweight in the world by Combat Press as of September 2022, and fourth best by Beyond Kick as of October 2022.

Kickboxing career
Mamazulonov fought Fotis Gkionis in the quarterfinals of the 2019 Tatneft 80kg tournament, held on August 24, 2019. He won the fight by an extra round decision.

Mamazulunov was scheduled to face Islam Murtazaev Wu Lin Feng 2019: WLF China vs Russia on September 20, 2019, in an WLF-Orion cross-promotional event. Murtazaev won the fight by decision. The bout was later awarded "Fight of the Year" honors at the 2019 "The Orion Awards".

Mamazulunov faced Musa Sultaev in the semifinals of the 2019 Tatneft 80kg tournament, held on October 4, 2019. Sultaev won the bout by an extra round decision.

Mamazulunov was scheduled to face Maksim Zaplitniy at WKF 5 Fighting Championship on February 24, 2020. He won the fight by unanimous decision.

Mamazulunov was scheduled to face Dmitry Valent at Fair Fight XIII on November 28, 2020. The fight went into an extra round, after which Mamazulunov was awarded the decision. The decision was seen as controversial, and was met with criticism online by a number of fans.

Mamazulunov was scheduled to fight Nikita Shostak in the co-main event of Fair Fight XIV on March 6, 2021. He won the fight by unanimous decision.

Mamazulunov was scheduled to face Evgeny Volchek at Fair Fight XV on August 28, 2021. He won the fight by split decision.

Mamazulunov was booked to face Sergey Ponomarev at Fair Fight XVI on February 12, 2022. After total domination of Sher Mamazulunov during the fight, decision was made to opponent favor. The decision resulted in massive dissatisfaction of the fans, and on February 17, the Fair Fight promotion announced that after considering the fight by independent judges, the fight was declared invalid and the judges serving the fight аrе suspended from Fair Fight tournaments.

Titles and accomplishments
Professional
Tatneft Cup
 2017 Tatneft Cup -80kg Champion
 2018 Tatneft Cup -80kg Champion 

Fair Fight
 2019 Fair Fight -77kg Champion  (1 defense)

Amateur
World Association of Kickboxing Organizations
 2015 WAKO Russia Low kick Champion
 2016 WAKO World Championships Low kick Champion
 2016 WAKO Russia K-1 Champion

World Pan Amateur Kick Boxing Association
 2016 WPKA Russia K-1 Champion
 
Awards
 2018 Orion Awards Fighter of the Year 
 2019 Orion Awards Fight of the Year (vs. Islam Murtazaev)

Fight record 
{{Kickboxing record start||norec=y|title=Kickboxing record|record=38 Wins, 8 Losses, 0 Draw}}

|-  style="text-align:center; background:#c5d2ea;" 
| 2022-02-12 || NC ||align=left| Sergey Ponomarev || Fair Fight XVI || Yekaterinburg, Russia || No contest || 5 || 3:00
|- 
! style=background:white colspan=9 |

|-  style="text-align:center; background:#cfc;" 
| 2021-08-28 || Win ||align=left| Evgeny Volchek || Fair Fight XV || Yekaterinburg, Russia || Decision (Split)|| 3 ||3:00

|-  style="text-align:center; background:#cfc;" 
| 2021-03-06 || Win ||align=left| Nikita Shostak || Fair Fight XIV || Yekaterinburg, Russia || Decision (Unanimous)|| 3 ||3:00

|-  style="text-align:center; background:#cfc;" 
| 2020-11-28 || Win ||align=left| Dmitry Valent || Fair Fight XIII || Yekaterinburg, Russia || Ext.R Decision || 4 ||3:00

|-  style="text-align:center; background:#cfc;" 
| 2020-02-24 || Win ||align=left| Maxim Zaplîtni ||  WKF 5 Fighting Championship || Minsk, Belarus ||Decision (Unanimous) || 3 || 3:00

|- align="center"  bgcolor="#fbb"
| 2019-10-04|| Loss ||align=left| Musa Sultaev || Tatneft Cup, -80kg Semi Final || Kazan, Russia || Ext.R Decision|| 4 || 3:00

|- align="center"  bgcolor="#fbb"
| 2019-09-20|| Loss ||align=left| Islam Murtazaev || Wu Lin Feng 2019: WLF China vs Russia || Moscow, Russia || Decision|| 3 || 3:00

|- align="center"  bgcolor="#cfc"
| 2019-08-24|| Win ||align=left| Fotis Gkionis || Tatneft Cup, -80kg Quarter Final || Kazan, Russia || Ext.R Decision|| 4 || 3:00

|-  style="text-align:center; background:#cfc;" 
| 2019-07-08 || Win ||align=left| Yuri Bessmertny || Fair Fight IX || Yekaterinburg, Russia ||Decision (Unanimous) || 5 || 3:00
|- 
! style=background:white colspan=9 |

|- align="center"  bgcolor="#cfc"
| 2019-06-11|| Win ||align=left| Bilal Bakhouche Chareuf || Tatneft Cup, -80kg 1/8 Final|| Kazan, Russia || Ext.R Decision|| 4 || 3:00

|-  style="text-align:center; background:#cfc;" 
| 2019-02-02 || Win ||align=left| Jonatan Oliveira  || Fair Fight VII, Final || Yekaterinburg, Russia || Ext.R Decision  || 4 || 3:00
|- 
! style=background:white colspan=9 |

|-  style="text-align:center; background:#cfc;" 
| 2019-02-02 || Win ||align=left| Sharabutdin Magomedov  || Fair Fight VII, Semi Final || Yekaterinburg, Russia || Ext.R Decision  || 4 || 3:00

|- align="center"  bgcolor="#cfc"
| 2018-12-07|| Win ||align=left| Ljubo Jalovi || Tatneft Cup, -80kg Tournament Final || Kazan, Russia ||  Ext.R Decision|| 4 || 3:00
|- 
! style=background:white colspan=9 |

|- align="center"  bgcolor="#cfc"
| 2018-10-27|| Win ||align=left| Victor Monfort || Tatneft Cup, -80kg Tournament Semi Final || Kazan, Russia ||  Decision|| 3 || 3:00

|- align="center"  bgcolor="#cfc"
| 2018-09-29|| Win ||align=left| Jonatan Oliveira || Fair Fight VI || Yekaterinburg, Russia ||  Decision (Unanimous) || 3 || 3:00

|- align="center"  bgcolor="#cfc"
| 2018-07-08|| Win ||align=left| Vladimir Idranyi || Fair Fight || Yekaterinburg, Russia ||  Decision (Unanimous) || 3 || 3:00

|- align="center"  bgcolor="#cfc"
| 2018-08-24|| Win ||align=left| Аleksandr Dmitrenko || Tatneft Cup, -80kg Tournament Quarter Final || Kazan, Russia || Ext.R Decision|| 4 || 3:00

|- align="center"  bgcolor="#cfc"
| 2018-05-31|| Win ||align=left| Ruslan Kostin || ACB KB 15: Grand Prix Kitek || Moscow, Russia || TKO (Punches)|| 1 || 1:45

|- align="center"  bgcolor="#cfc"
| 2017-12-14|| Win ||align=left| Dmitry Menshikov || TATNEFT CUP, -80kg Tournament Final || Kazan, Russia || Ext.R Decision|| 4 || 3:00
|- 
! style=background:white colspan=9 |

|- align="center"  bgcolor="#cfc"
| 2017-10-27|| Win ||align=left| Vladimir Degtyarev || TATNEFT CUP, -80kg Tournament Semi Final || Kazan, Russia || Ext.R KO (Knee to the Body)|| 4 || 

|- align="center"  bgcolor="#fbb"
| 2017-09-30|| Loss ||align=left| Vasiliy Semenov || Fair Fight 4, Semi Final || Yekaterinburg, Russia || Decision|| 3 || 3:00

|- align="center"  bgcolor="#cfc"
| 2017-07-19|| Win ||align=left| Andrey Chekhonin || TATNEFT CUP, -80kg Quarter Final || Kazan, Russia || Ext.R Decision|| 4 || 3:00

|- align="center"  bgcolor="#cfc"
| 2017-06-21|| Win ||align=left| Ivan Van Hong Tun|| Fair Fight III|| Yekaterinburg, Russia || KO (Knee to the Body)|| 3 || 

|- align="center"  bgcolor="#cfc"
| 2017-03-22|| Win ||align=left| Aleksandr Drobinin || TATNEFT CUP, -80kg Tournament 1/8 Final || Kazan, Russia || Ext.R Decision|| 4 || 3:00

|- align="center"  bgcolor="#fbb"
| 2017-01-|| Loss ||align=left| Mamuka Usubyan || Fair Fight I|| Yekaterinburg, Russia || Decision|| 3 || 3:00

|- align="center"  bgcolor="#fbb"
| 2016-07-22|| Loss ||align=left| Аleksandr Dmitrenko || Tatneft Cup, Quarter Finals || Kazan, Russia || Ext.R Decision|| 4 || 3:00

|- align="center"  bgcolor="#cfc"
| 2016-05-25|| Win ||align=left| Justin Dap || Tatneft Cup, 1/8 Finals || Kazan, Russia || Ext.R Decision|| 4 || 3:00
|-
| colspan=9 | Legend''':

See also 
List of male kickboxers

References

1995 births
Living people
Welterweight kickboxers
Uzbekistani kickboxers
Sportspeople from Tashkent
Uzbekistani sportspeople